XPointer is a system for addressing components of XML-based Internet media. It is divided among four specifications: a "framework" that forms the basis for identifying XML fragments, a positional element addressing scheme, a scheme for namespaces, and a scheme for XPath-based addressing. XPointer Framework is a W3C recommendation since March 2003.

The XPointer language is designed to address structural aspects of XML, including text content and other information objects created as a result of parsing the document. Thus, it could be used to point to a section of a document highlighted by a user through a mouse drag action.

During development, and until 2016, XPointer was covered by a royalty-free technology patent held by Sun Microsystems.

Positional Element Addressing 
The element() scheme introduces positional addressing of child elements.  This is similar to a simple XPath address, but subsequent steps can only be numbers representing the position of a descendant relative to its branch on the tree.

For instance, given the following fragment:

<foobar id="foo">
  <bar/>
  <baz>
    <bom a="1"/>
  </baz>
  <bom a="2"/>
</foobar>

results as the following examples:

  xpointer(id("foo")) => foobar
  xpointer(/foobar/1) => bar
  xpointer(//bom) => bom (a=1), bom (a=2)
  element(/1/2/1) => bom (a=1) (/1 descend into first element (foobar),
                                /2 descend into second child element (baz),
                                /1 select first child element (bom))

See also 
 URI fragment
 HTML
 HyTime
 Text Encoding Initiative Guidelines
 XML

References

External links 
 XPointer Framework
 Namespacing
 Path based addressing
 XPointer patent terms and conditions
 Open source implementation (CognitiveWeb)
 GPL License .NET implementation (XInclude.NET)
 Method and system for implementing hypertext scroll attributes on Google Patents, expired 2016-02-01

World Wide Web Consortium standards
XML data access